The canton of Drôme des collines is an administrative division of the Drôme department, southeastern France. It was created at the French canton reorganisation which came into effect in March 2015. Its seat is in Saint-Donat-sur-l'Herbasse.

It consists of the following communes:
 
Arthémonay
Bathernay
Bren
Le Chalon
Charmes-sur-l'Herbasse
Châteauneuf-de-Galaure
Chavannes
Crépol
Épinouze
Geyssans
Le Grand-Serre
Hauterives
Lapeyrouse-Mornay
Lens-Lestang
Manthes
Margès
Marsaz
Montchenu
Montmiral
Moras-en-Valloire
Parnans
Ratières
Saint-Avit
Saint-Christophe-et-le-Laris
Saint-Donat-sur-l'Herbasse
Saint-Laurent-d'Onay
Saint-Martin-d'Août
Saint-Michel-sur-Savasse
Saint-Sorlin-en-Valloire
Tersanne
Valherbasse

References

Cantons of Drôme